Tony Dale Arnold (born May 3, 1959) is a former Major League Baseball pitcher.

He played college baseball at the University of Texas at Austin, where he was selected as a 1981 College Baseball All-American.  His 21 consecutive victories is tied for seventh in Division I college baseball.

He is currently the pitching coach for the Lynchburg Hillcats, the Single-A affiliate of the Cleveland Guardians.

References

External links

Baltimore Orioles players
1959 births
Living people
Baseball players from Texas
Texas Longhorns baseball players
Major League Baseball pitchers
Recipients of the Gaudeamus International Interpreters Award
Miami Orioles players
Bluefield Orioles players
Charlotte O's players
Hagerstown Suns players
Rochester Red Wings players
Albuquerque Dukes players
Bakersfield Dodgers players
San Antonio Missions players
Sportspeople from El Paso, Texas
All-American college baseball players